Future Past is the fifteenth studio album by the British band Duran Duran, released on 22 October 2021. It is the band's first album to be released through BMG, and their first since 2015's Paper Gods six years prior.

The album, co-produced by the band alongside Mark Ronson, Giorgio Moroder and Erol Alkan, also features guest appearances by Tove Lo, Ivorian Doll, Japanese band Chai, and Mike Garson. Blur's Graham Coxon is the guitarist on the album.

The band released the album's first single "Invisible" on 19 May 2021. The tracks "More Joy!" featuring Chai, "Anniversary", "Tonight United" and "Give It All Up" featuring Tove Lo were also released in advance of the album.

Background and content
John Taylor described Future Past as a "very emotionally deep album", revealing that the lyrics were primarily written before 2020's COVID-19 lockdowns: "Many of the songs are about emotional crises, or long-term intimacy issues, let's call them. When we came back after lockdown, I felt that those lyrics, particularly 'Invisible,' spoke to the moment, because the last 18 months have really been about intimacy politics."

Cover art
The cover is a colourised and combined image of two black-and-white pictures by Japanese photographer Daisuke Yokota. Nick Rhodes met Yokota in 2017 while researching for a documentary about Japanese photographers. The album's art director Rory McCartney laid the images over the top of one another, creating the effect of a stationary silhouette in red with another silhouette in green moving beyond it, which resonated with McCartney.

Track listing

Notes
  signifies vocal producer
  signifies an assistant producer
  These tracks are not included on vinyl version

Tour
On 15 March 2022, a 14-date North American tour to promote the album, as well as to celebrate the band's album Rios 40th anniversary, was announced. The tour was to begin on 19 August 2022 in Welch, Minnesota and conclude on 11 September 2022 at the Hollywood Bowl in Los Angeles. Due to inclement weather, the first show was postponed to a later date. Nile Rodgers and Chic along with Bastille are serving as the opening act. Rodgers was a major early influence to the band and has collaborated with Duran Duran at numerous points throughout the band’s history. 

 Shows 

PersonnelDuran Duran Simon Le Bon – vocals
 Nick Rhodes – keyboards, band photo
 John Taylor – bass
 Roger Taylor – drumsAdditional musicians Barli – backing vocals
 Graham Coxon – guitar
 Joshua Blair – piano, programming (all tracks); string arrangement (1–3, 5–8), keyboards (3–8), guitar (6), additional keyboards, keyboards programming (9, 10, 12)
 Erol Alkan – programming (1, 9), synthesizer (1, 3), drum programming (2–5, 9, 10, 12), hand clap (2, 10), percussion, tambourine (2)
 Tove Lo – vocals (3)
 Giorgio Moroder – additional keyboards (6, 7)
 Saffron Le Bon – backing vocals (6, 7, 9, 10)
 Mark Ronson – guitar (8)
 Ivorian Doll – vocals (10)
 Chai – vocals (11)
 Mike Garson – piano (12)Technical Wendy Laister – executive production
 John Webber – mastering
 Mark "Spike" Stent – mixing
 Joshua Blair – engineering, Pro Tools
 Austin Creek – engineering (12)
 Peter Karlsson – vocal engineering (3)
 Cory Bice – vocal engineering (3)
 Ritchie Kennedy – additional engineering (1, 2, 4, 5, 9, 10), engineering assistance (3)
 Tom Herbert – engineering assistance (1–5, 9, 10, 12)
 Ed Farrell – engineering assistance (1–5, 9, 10, 12)
 Matt Wolach – mixing assistance
 Benji Compston – production management
 Hannie Knox – production assistanceDesign'
 Rory McCartney – art direction
 Daisuke Yokota – cover art, photography

Charts

References

External links

2021 albums
Albums produced by Erol Alkan
Albums produced by Giorgio Moroder
Albums produced by Mark Ronson
BMG Rights Management albums
Duran Duran albums